"You Should Have Been Gone by Now" is a song co-written and recorded by American country music artist Eddy Raven.  It was released in December 1985 as the third single from the album Love and Other Hard Times.  The song reached #3 on the Billboard Hot Country Singles & Tracks chart.  It was written by Raven, Don Pfrimmer and Frank J. Myers.

Chart performance

References

1986 singles
Eddy Raven songs
Songs written by Frank J. Myers
Songs written by Don Pfrimmer
Songs written by Eddy Raven
Song recordings produced by Paul Worley
RCA Records singles
1986 songs